Ayoub is the Arabic name of the biblical figure Job.

It may also refer to:

Given name
Ayoob Kara (born 1955), Israeli Druze politician
Ayoob Tarish (born 1942), Yemeni singer and melodist

Surname
 Joe Ayoob (born 1984), Lebanese-American arena football quarterback
 Massad Ayoob (born 1948), American firearms and self-defense instructor
 Mohammed Ayoob (born 1942), professor of International Relations

See also
Ayoub
 Ayub (name)